The men's 1500 meter at the 2012 KNSB Dutch Single Distance Championships took place in Heerenveen at the Thialf ice skating rink on Sunday 6 November 2011. Although this tournament was held in 2011 it was part of the speed skating season 2011–2012. There were 24 participants.

Statistics

Result

Source:

Draw

References

Single Distance Championships
2012 Single Distance